Stig Nilsson (1931–2008) was a Swedish footballer who played as a forward.

References

1931 births
2008 deaths
Association football forwards
Swedish footballers
Allsvenskan players
Malmö FF players